Psila collaris is a species of rust flies (insects in the family Psilidae).

References

Psilidae
Articles created by Qbugbot
Insects described in 1869